Tianhe District is one of the eleven districts of Guangzhou, the capital of Guangdong province. In Chinese, the name Tianhe literally means "a river in the sky/heavens", which is also a Chinese name for the Milky Way. It is bordered by Yuexiu District on the west, Baiyun District on the north and Huangpu District on the east. Haizhu District is on its south, though they are separated by the Pearl River.

Tianhe became a district in the 1980s as the city expanded its size. Back then, it was east of Dongshan District (which was merged into Yuexiu in 2005) and retained a suburban or even rural atmosphere. A majority of colleges and universities in the city were located in the district. However, Tianhe District has seen a sharp decline in arable land at an average rate of 1,000 mu per year due to urbanization since 1991. Tianhe has since developed into one of the most desirable areas in Guangzhou.

Symbolic landmarks of Guangzhou located in Tianhe District are: Citic Plaza, Guangzhou International Finance Center, Guangzhou Opera House, and the Guangdong Museum.  The 6th and 9th of The National Games of the People's Republic of China, and the 2010 Asian Games were also held in Tianhe District, Guangzhou.

History
Prehistoric population settled in what is now Longdong Subdistrict in the Neolithic Period. Eastern Han tombs were discovered in Tianhe. During the Song Dynasty, Tianhe area was called Dashuixu.
The area of modern Tianhe District was part of Panyu County for more than two thousand years. The area was gradually put under Guangzhou's administration between 1937 and 1958. By the liberation of Guangzhou (October 1949), there were two districts in Tianhe area, namely Shahe and Shipai. In 1951 both districts were merged into the newly established Baiyun District, while five years later Baiyun was further merged with Huangpu and Xinjiao Districts to form suburban district. In 1960 Jiaoqu was dissolved and the area consisting of modern Tianhe became Huangpu District, however it was reestablished two years later. In 1985 part of Jiaoqu was split, and Tianhe District was established then.

In 1987 Tonghe Town was put into Baiyun District. In 1992 Yangji Cun was put into Dongshan District. By 1994, Kemulang, Yushatan, and Fenghuang Farms along with Shadongcun and Erduicun were placed under Tianhe's jurisdiction. In 2000, former Xintang, Mubei, Lingtang, and Yushu Farms were also placed under Tianhe and the farms gradually became subdistricts.

Administrative divisions

Developments
The first big project built in the district during the 1980s was the Tianhe Sports Center when the city was selected to host the Sixth National Games in 1986. The complex includes a stadium of 65,000 seats, a gymnasium and an indoor swimming pool. Its construction had a lasting impact on the development of the district. Soon other projects followed and rice fields gave way to residential complexes called xiaoqu (meaning "little districts"). The construction of xiaoqu began in the mid and late eighties and most of them had residential buildings of no more than 10 stories.  Each floor was kept to no more than four units due to the lack of elevators since they would increase the construction cost.  Also, due to the sheer number of residential buildings – some xiaoqu had more than 20 residential buildings –  a lot of land was needed and thus converted.

The building of Guangzhou East railway station in 1990 further contributed to the growth of the district. To relieve the traffic, the East Railroad Station was built and is now the terminus for trains to and from Hong Kong and Shenzhen.

As the district developed, the size of xiaoqu became smaller since land became more valuable and expensive.  Most of the new xiaoqu now only consist of four to six residential buildings but each can contain 30 floors or more since the growth of district attracted big developers where the cost of construction (such as elevators) was no longer an issue. Also, taller residential buildings gave rise to taller office buildings.

South of the Sports Center and north of the Zhujiang River is Zhujiang New Town, an area desolate a decade ago but which is now one of the fastest-developing areas of Guangzhou. Many of Guangzhou's newest and most iconic buildings are found in this part of the district.

Several venues used for the 2010 Asian Games are located in Tianhe District.

Economy
Guangzhou Science City
Kung Fu restaurants has its headquarters in the district
Jinyi Cinemas has its headquarters in the district
Chow Sang Sang's Mainland division, Chow Sang Sang (China) Company Limited
Google has its Guangzhou office in Teemtower (天河城大厦) of Teem Plaza.
All Nippon Airways operates its Guangzhou Office in the district. Since May 3, 2011 it has been located in Tower A of Victory Plaza. On May 2, 2011 and prior, it was located in the 2605 CITIC Plaza.
Renren.com has its Guangzhou office in China Shine Plaza (耀中广场).
56.com was headquartered in Huajingyuan (华景园) in Tianhe Software Park (天河软件园) when it was an independent company.
R&F Properties has its head office in Zhujiang New Town.
Agile Property is in Tianhe District.
Hopson Development was previously in Zhujiang New Town.

Diplomatic missions
The Consulate General of the United States, Guangzhou is in Zhujiang New Town, Tianhe District.

Education
Many of the city's colleges and universities are located in the district. They include:
 Guangzhou Sport University
 PLA Institute of Physical Education, Guangzhou
 Jinan University
 Guangdong University of Technology
 South China Agricultural University
 South China University of Technology
 South China Normal University

International schools in the district include:
 Japanese School of Guangzhou
 Huamei-Bond International College
 Guangzhou Nanfang International School

Former international schools:
 American International School of Guangzhou in The Greenery
 École Française Internationale de Canton in Favorview

Transportation
Besides the Guangzhou East railway station (referred to by locals as simply "East Station"), Tianhe is also the terminus for several Guangzhou Metro lines, and one line goes through it:

Metro
Tianhe is currently service by five metro lines operated by Guangzhou Metro:

 – Tiyu Xilu, Tianhe Sports Center, Guangzhou East Station
  – Yantang, Guangzhou East Station, Linhexi, Tiyu Xilu
  – Tianhe Coach Terminal, Wushan, South China Normal University, Gangding, Shipaiqiao, Tiyu Xilu, Zhujiang New Town
 – Huangcun, Chebei, Chebeinan
 – Zhujiang New Town, Liede, Tancun, Yuancun, Keyun Lu, Chebeinan, Dongpu, Sanxi
 – Shaheding, Shahe (u/c), Tianpingjia, Yantang, Tianhe Coach Terminal, Changban, Botanical Garden, Longdong, Kemulang, Gaotangshi
 – Yuancun, Tianhe Park, Tangdong, Huangcun, Daguannanlu, Tianhe Smart City
 – Linhexi, Tianhe Sports Center South, Tianhenan, Huangpu Dadao, Guangzhou Women and Children's Medical Center, Huacheng Dadao, Guangzhou Opera House, Haixinsha

Notable buildings

 CITIC Plaza, an 80-story,  skyscraper completed in 1997, situated between Tianhe Sports Center and Guangzhou East Railway Station. It was the tallest building in China then, and now it ranks as the 3rd tallest building in Guangzhou, 8th in China, 11th in Asia, and 16th worldwide.
 Pearl River Tower, a skyscraper in Zhujiang New Town, which is the first zero-energy building in China. It is owned by China Tobacco.
 Guangzhou International Finance Center, a  skyscraper. It was built between 2005 and 2010.
 Guangzhou CTF Finance Center, Currently it is the tallest building in Guangzhou.
 The famous shopping mall, TeeMall, a very big shopping centre, the Chinese from Guangzhou even call it the biggest shopping mall in Asia (although the biggest mall in Asia is actually the Golden Resources Mall in Beijing).

See also 

 Asteroid 188867 Tin Ho, named after the Tianhe District

References

External links

Official Site 

 
Districts of Guangzhou